The PSD Bank Meeting was an annual indoor track and field competition which took place in February at the Arena-Sportpark in Düsseldorf, Germany. The inaugural edition 1. Internationales Indoor Meeting Düsseldorf was held in 2006 and attracted a sell-out crowd of 1500 people. The competition was created following investment by the Düsseldorf municipal council, bringing a new usage to the venue which had served as a training facility for the 1977 IAAF World Cup.

The second edition of the competition attracted a number of high calibre athletes from Europe, Africa, Asia and North America, with David Gillick's Irish national record in the 400 metres being a highlight. The meeting was one of a handful of competitions which holds permit status from the European Athletics Association. It established itself on the international circuit with frequent world-leading performances from athletes and typically sell-out editions in the 2000 capacity venue.

In 2008, Cuban Dayron Robles ran 7.33 seconds for the 60 metres hurdles which was a Panamerican record for the event and the second fastest ever. Among the performances in 2010 was an Asian indoor record for the 5000 m by Essa Ismail Rashed. The sixth edition of the meeting in 2011 saw 18-year-old Isaiah Koech run the fourth fastest indoor 5000 metres in history, which was also the fastest ever by a junior athlete. Katja Demut also set a German record in the triple jump at that year's event.

The last edition took place in 2020. In 2021 a new meeting format was organized under the name ISTAF Indoor Düsseldorf that was new located at the ISS Dome.

From 2018 onwards the previously sponsor PSD Bank also started a main sponsorship at the Indoor Meeting in Dortmund.

Meeting records

Men

Women

References

External links
Official website

Annual indoor track and field meetings
Athletics competitions in Germany
Sport in Düsseldorf
Recurring sporting events established in 2006
2006 establishments in Germany
World Athletics Indoor Tour